San Pablo Municipality may refer to:
 San Pablo, Bolívar, Colombia
 San Pablo, Nariño, Colombia
 San Pablo, San Marcos, Honduras
 San Pablo, Isabela, Philippines
 San Pablo, Zamboanga del Sur, Philippines

Municipality name disambiguation pages